Jakub Štochl (born 2 February 1987) is a professional Czech football player who currently plays for Vlašim.

References
 
 
 Football

Czech footballers
Czech First League players
1987 births
Living people
1. FK Příbram players
FK Jablonec players
Bohemians 1905 players
FC Sellier & Bellot Vlašim players
Association football defenders
People from Hořovice
Sportspeople from the Central Bohemian Region